Nebriagonum is a genus of ground beetles in the family Carabidae. There are about 11 described species in Nebriagonum, found in Indonesia and Papua New Guinea.

Species
These 11 species belong to the genus Nebriagonum:
 Nebriagonum arboreum Darlington, 1952
 Nebriagonum basipunctum Baehr, 2012
 Nebriagonum bipunctatum Baehr, 2012
 Nebriagonum cephalum Darlington, 1952
 Nebriagonum foedum Darlington, 1971
 Nebriagonum percephalum Darlington, 1952
 Nebriagonum persetosum Baehr, 2012
 Nebriagonum subcephalum Darlington, 1952
 Nebriagonum transitior Darlington, 1952
 Nebriagonum transitum Darlington, 1952
 Nebriagonum unipunctum Baehr, 2008

References

Platyninae